Stephanie Renee Castellón Cordón (born 27 August 1992) is a Guatemalan retired footballer who played as a goalkeeper. She has been a member of the Guatemala women's national team.

Early life
Castellón was raised in Riverside, California.

College career
Castellón attended the Houston Baptist University in Houston, Texas.

International career
Castellón capped for Guatemala at senior level during the 2010 CONCACAF Women's World Cup Qualifying qualification and the 2010 Central American and Caribbean Games.

References

1992 births
Living people
American emigrants to Guatemala
Guatemala women's international footballers
Guatemalan women's footballers
Houston Christian Huskies women's soccer players
Soccer players from Riverside, California
Sportspeople from Newport Beach, California
Women's association football goalkeepers